Zara Whites (born Esther Kooiman, 8 November 1968) is a French-Dutch former pornographic film actress.

Zara Whites dropped out of school at an early age and moved in with her boyfriend when she was 17. In her late teens she worked as a barmaid and at the age of 19, as a prostitute in two men's clubs in Rotterdam.

Career in pornography

In 1992, she was briefly married to Italian porn actor Roberto Malone and reoriented her career towards non-sex roles in soft core with a French TV series for M6, Joy. In 1998, she made a comeback with a lesbian hardcore movie, La Dresseuse directed by Alain Payet.

Campaigner for animal rights
She has appeared in various French TV programmes on issues such as the legislative election and vegetarian cuisine.

In 2006, Zara published her autobiography, titled Je suis Zara Whites mais je me soigne.

She was nominated for the French electoral campaign of 2007, by the name of Esther Spincer.

References

Works
 Zara Whites (1992). Ma vie et mes fantasmes – Jean-Claude Lattès –  (NOTE: in French).
 Zara Whites (2006), Je suis Zara Whites mais je me soigne – Jean-Claude Gawsewitch –  (NOTE: in French).

External links

 
 
 
 Blog of Esther Kooiman / Zara Whites

1968 births
Living people
Dutch activists
Dutch women activists
Dutch pornographic film actresses
Dutch prostitutes
People from Binnenmaas